Dr. Octagon is a persona created and used by American rapper Keith Matthew Thornton, better known as Kool Keith. First appearing on Thornton's 1996 debut solo album, Dr. Octagonecologyst. The album examines the impersonal/delusional/authoritarian aspects of institutions/bureaucracies using the general hospital and psych ward as main metaphor. 
The hyper-love of new technologies is also a theme. Thornton performed and released two albums under the alias. The character was murdered by Dr. Dooom on Thornton's 1999 album First Come, First Served, and was briefly revived before once again being killed on Thornton's 2008 album Dr. Dooom 2, in response to the release of The Return of Dr. Octagon, an album largely produced without Thornton's involvement. Kool Keith reunited with Dan the Automator and DJ Qbert to release Moosebumps: An Exploration Into Modern Day Horripilation on April 6, 2018.

Biography 

Dr. Octagon is an extraterrestrial surgeon from Jupiter who uses space technology and primitive tools to perform medical procedures on his patients, some of whom die as he conducts his rounds, while others are murdered by his careless, barbaric acts. Octagon also practices as an orthopedic gynecologist and seduces and engages in sexual intercourse with his female patients and nurses.

Octagon, who dubs himself the "paramedic fetus of the east," is from the church of the operating room and was born on the planet Jupiter. His physical features include having yellow eyes, green and silver skin which also changes to blue and brown, a pink-and-white Afro, and a brain that glows yellow, black, red, green, and purple. Octagon also states that he can change his face with the press of a button, disappear, and wears a 7XL which has not yet been invented, X Ray sunglasses, hard shoes with razor blades, and a white suit and stethoscope.

Octagon specifies a few of the services he offers, such as treatment of chimpanzee acne and moosebumps, and performs rectal rebuilding surgery and relocates saliva glands. Octagon also performs medical experiments at night when the moon is out. Proclaiming that his hammer is dull and his drill is broken, Dr. Octagon tells patients that he doesn't have tools. Instead, he states that he'll rip out a stomach, dissect open rectums, put needles in kneecaps, apply Clorox to vocal boxes, and watch his patients vomit green. Dr. Octagon's office number is 1-800-pp51-doodoo, and his patients often wait in a waiting room for long periods of time before he dismisses the ones that have been waiting since morning. Octagon's hospital also houses mental patients that dance in the halls. Octagon has fed green fly soup to his patients on occasion, and has given patients a mixture of Pepsi cola, Pepto-Bismol, bugs, and pop rocks to watch them cough until they turn blue. One of Octagon's patients dies in room number 105 with cirrhosis of the eye while there is a horse loose in the hospital. Another patient is taken by Dr. Octagon out of the bathroom into water to touch the submerged electric wires. Octagon claims to hide the dead bodies of his patients in Beverly Hills, CA. Octagon's 208-year-old uncle, Mr. Gerbik, is described as being half shark, having the skin of an alligator, and carrying a dead walrus.

According to Kool Keith's "R.I.P. Dr. Octagon", Dr. Dooom stabbed Dr. Octagon over 17 times after he'd come back to life from being drowned under water. Multiple music critics and record producers made attempts to keep him alive, but Dooom returned to finally kill Octagon by electrocuting him with an electric razor. However, Kool Keith has continued to make appearances as Dr. Octagon.

History 
The earliest instance of Thornton's Dr. Octagon character appears on the unreleased Ultramagnetic MC's demo "Smoking Dust", recorded in 1993 and  included in the 1994 compilation album The Basement Tapes 1984-1990. On this demo, Thornton refers to himself as "Doctor Oc" and raps in a deeper cadence, with lyrics that intertwine grotesque pornographic imagery with science-fiction.

Thornton and KutMasta Kurt recorded two songs under the alias Dr. Octagon, "Dr. Octagon" and "Technical Difficulties." Thornton mailed the songs to radio stations as a teaser, as well as giving copies to several DJs, as well as producer Dan "The Automator" Nakamura, resulting in the production of Dr. Octagonecologyst. The album was recorded in Automator's studio in the basement of his parents' San Francisco home. Dr. Octagonecologyst featured the work of turntablist DJ Qbert and additional production by KutMasta Kurt. An instrumental version of the album was released under the title Instrumentalyst (Octagon Beats). KutMasta Kurt later pursued legal action against Automator because Kurt's demos had initiated the project. Kurt told the AV Club, “I got the whole [Dr. Octagon] thing started and really got nothing directly out of it. [Automator] ran with it, but he never gave credit to the person who threw the ball. At the end of the day, I actually had to sue the guy."

In promotion of the album, Thornton toured under the Dr. Octagon billing. These performances featured a full live band, an on-stage breakdancer and appearances by Invisibl Skratch Piklz. Nakamura has referred to Dr. Octagon as a three-person group rather than an alias of Thornton, and these claims were reported by the press.

Thornton later expressed some frustration with the "Dr. Octagon" nickname, saying, "Octagon wasn't my life...I've done a lot of things that were totally around different things other than Octagon. Are some people just afraid to venture off into my life and see that I do other things which are great? I think people stuck me with something."

In 2002, Thornton announced The Resurrection of Dr. Octagon, a proposed sequel to Dr. Octagonecologyst, that would reintroduce the character.
Los Angeles-based producer Fanatik J was chosen to create the music for the album. Thornton himself took part in the production of early material for the project, playing bass, guitar, and keyboards on many of the tracks.

After shopping around demos for the proposed album, Thornton signed a contract with CMH Records to release the album.
On July 23, 2002, Rolling Stone reported that a new Dr. Octagon album would be released in February 2003. As production on the album was underway, Thornton had a falling out with Fanatik J over contract rights, and the One-Watt Sun production team was hired to create the album's music. After completing three vocal tracks with the label, based upon rough sonic themes created by the production team, Thornton had a falling out with the label, and gave the label recordings he had made two years previously, consisting of Thornton rapping and goofing off, in order to complete his contract. The resulting album, The Return of Dr. Octagon, was largely produced without Thornton's involvement, and did not resemble the direction Thornton had initially intended for the album.

Promotional materials, including music videos, were produced without Thornton's involvement. Thornton states that he was "shocked" by the label's misrepresentation. Following the release of the album, Thornton performed under the Dr. Octagon billing, but did not promote the album. Dr. Dooom 2, Thornton's 2008 follow-up to First Come, First Served, was produced in response to The Return of Dr. Octagon. In the music video for "R.I.P. Dr. Octagon", the appearance of Dr. Octagon resembles the character design used in promotional materials by CMH Records.

In 2013, Dr. Octagon made a guest appearance on the Yeah Yeah Yeahs song "Buried Alive", which was featured on their album Mosquito.

Once again performing as Dr. Octagon, Kool Keith reunited with Dan The Automator and DJ Qbert to release Moosebumps: An Exploration Into Modern Day Horripilation on Bulk Recordings. The album was released on streaming services on April 6, 2018, with the physical release scheduled for Record Store Day, April 21, 2018. The Record Store Day release includes both vinyl and CD copies. Using his Deltron persona, Del the Funky Homosapien guests on "3030 Meets the Doc, Pt. 1". NPR offered a first look at the album on March 29, 2018. 2020's  Space Goretex features Dr. Octagon and two of Thornton's other personas, Dr. Dooom and Black Elvis.

Discography 
Studio albums
 1996 – Dr. Octagonecologyst
 2006 – The Return of Dr. Octagon
 2018 – Moosebumps: An Exploration Into Modern Day Horripilation

References

External links
Talkin Back to Back: Dr. Octagon at Metal Lungies

Octagon, Dr.
Octagon, Dr.
Fictional obstetricians and gynaecologists
Octagon, Dr.
Octagon, Dr.
Songs about time travel